Zulhasnan bin Rafique (Jawi: ذوالحسنان بن رفيق; born 20 September 1954) is a Malaysian politician and the former Minister of Federal Territories. He is a former Member of Parliament of Malaysia for Wangsa Maju and Setiawangsa constituencies in Kuala Lumpur and a supreme council member in the United Malay National Organisation (UMNO), the largest component party in the previously ruling coalition Barisan Nasional (BN).

Life
Zulhasnan joined the Royal Malaysian Air Force as a fighter pilot and retired in 1985 with the rank of Major (Squadron leader in other countries) before entering politics.

Politics
Zulhasnan debuted in the 1999 Malaysian general election and won the Wangsa Maju seat to be elected as a Member of Parliament. In the 2004 general election, he contested and won the Setiawangsa parliamentary seat. On 27 March 2004, following a cabinet reshuffle by Prime Minister Abdullah Ahmad Badawi, the Federal Territory and Klang Valley Planning and Development Division was upgraded to a full-fledged ministry. Its responsibility expanded to include jurisdiction over the territories of Labuan and Putrajaya. Zulhasnan was the first deputy minister to be appointed to the ministry.

Mohd Isa Abdul Samad was the first minister to be appointed. However, Isa was dismissed from office after he was found guilty of corruption charges related to money politics during the UMNO General Assembly Election of 2005. Shahrizat Abdul Jalil (then the Minister for Women, Family and Community Development) assumed the responsibilities of acting minister until a replacement could be found.

On 16 February 2006, Zulhasnan was appointed the Federal Territories Minister. Under the leadership of Zulhasnan, a strategic plan that focused on development plans for all three Federal Territories was created. In the 2008 election, he was reelected again as a Member of Parliament. He was dropped from the new cabinet on 9 April 2009 by Najib Abdul Razak who took over as the 6th Prime Minister. He was not chosen by Barisan Nasional to recontest the Setiawangsa seat in the 2013 election.

He was appointed as the Malaysian Ambassador to the United States, replacing Awang Adek Hussin in December 2016. But he resigned in April 2018 to contest in the 2018 election the Setiawangsa constituency again. Following the huge swing of votes to the coalition Pakatan Harapan, he lost and failed to win back his former parliamentary seat.

Election results

Honours

Honours of Malaysia
  :
  Member of the Order of the Defender of the Realm (AMN) (1982)
  Commander of the Order of Loyalty to the Crown of Malaysia (PSM) - Tan Sri (2013)
  :
  Grand Knight of the Order of the Territorial Crown (SUMW) - Datuk Seri Utama (2015)
  :
  Knight Companion of the Order of the Crown of Pahang (DIMP) - Dato' (1998)
  Grand Knight of the Order of Sultan Ahmad Shah of Pahang (SSAP) - Dato' Sri (2006)
  :
  Commander of the Order of the Defender of State (DGPN) - Dato' Seri (2007)

See also
Wangsa Maju (federal constituency)
Setiawangsa (federal constituency)

References

 
 

1954 births
Living people
People from Selangor
Minangkabau people
Malaysian people of Minangkabau descent
Malaysian people of Malay descent
Malaysian Muslims
Malaysian military personnel
Royal Malaysian Air Force personnel
Malaysian businesspeople
Ambassadors of Malaysia to the United States
United Malays National Organisation politicians
Members of the Dewan Rakyat
Government ministers of Malaysia
Members of the Order of the Defender of the Realm
Commanders of the Order of Loyalty to the Crown of Malaysia
21st-century Malaysian politicians